Stigmella watti is a moth of the family Nepticulidae. It is found in New Zealand.

The length of the forewings is about 3.5 mm. Adults have been recorded in February. There is probably one generation per year.

The larvae feed on Olearia colensoi νar. grandis and possibly Olearia oporina. They mine the leaves of their host plant. The mine is a narrow, linear gallery in the upper surface of the leaf. The larva mines from cell to cell and the gallery at first is only one cell wide, hence the margin is somewhat irregular. The mine becomes packed with dry, granular frass. Larva have been recorded in May. They are 3–4 mm long and pale green.

The cocoon is brown and attached to the leaves and stem of the host plant.

References

External links
Fauna of New Zealand - Number 16: Nepticulidae (Insecta: Lepidoptera)

Nepticulidae
Moths of New Zealand
Moths described in 1989